Sensormatic is a subsidiary of Tyco International (now owned by Johnson Controls) that manufactures and sells electronic article surveillance equipment.  Sensormatic Electronics Corporation was purchased by Tyco International in 2001.  The acquisition was executed by a merger of Sensormatic with a subsidiary of Tyco.  Sensormatic is frequently called by the name of its parent company ADT, formerly ADT/Tyco. They manufacture acusto-magnetic (AM) electronic article surveillance systems.

The Sensormatic Supertag is a hard loss prevention tag.  The Supertag took over for the Sensormatic Ultragator tag.  Ultragator is a tan Ultra Max tag that is sold to retail companies.  Ultragator tags were improved upon during the design of the Supertag.

Sensormatic specializes in the area of sourcetagging.  A sourcetag is a security tag or label applied during the manufacturing process.  Recently Sensormatic introduced disposable hard source tags at a few retail chains.

External links 
 

Johnson Controls
Security technology
Wireless locating